Drăgoiești is a commune located in Suceava County, Romania. It is composed of three villages: Drăgoiești, Lucăcești and Măzănăești.

References

Communes in Suceava County
Localities in Southern Bukovina